Nanda ministry may refer to:

First Nanda ministry, the Interim Indian government headed by Gulzarilal Nanda in 1964
Second Nanda ministry, the Interim Indian government headed by Gulzarilal Nanda in 1966

See also
 Gulzarilal Nanda